Giovanni Bovio (6 February 1837 – 15 April 1903) was an Italian philosopher and a politician of the Italian Republican Party.

Bovio was born in Trani. He was a member of the Chamber of Deputies of the Parliament of the Kingdom of Italy. He wrote a philosophical work in 1864 called Il Verbo Novello.

He was involved in setting up the radical movement "Fascio della democrazia"  in 1883. In 1895 he founded the Italian Republican Party.

A plaque on the house on Piazza Giovanni Bovio number 38 recalls his death in that house:In this house died, poor and uncontaminated Giovanni Bovio, who by meditating with free spirit the infinite and consecrating the reasons of the peoples in adamantine pages, revived with great splendor Italian thought and was a prescient seer of the new age. U Buccini 1905

Bovio was a Freemason initiated to the 33rd degree of the Scottish Rite, after having joined the lodge Caprera of Trani in 1863.
His grandfather Francesco Bovio was also a Freemason.

Ancestors and descendants of Giovanni Bovio 
 Francesco Maria Bovio (1750s - 1830) - Giovanni Bovio's grandfather - professor of law, Latin, Ancient Greek and literature at Regie Scuole of Matera and of the University of Altamura. He was also judge and a Freemason, member of the masonic lodge Oriente di Altamura. Moreover, he fought for the Parthenopean Republic, by joining in the so-called Altamuran Revolution (1799)
 Nicola Bovio - Giovanni Bovio's father
 Scipione Bovio - Giovanni Bovio's uncle
 Corso Bovio - Giovanni Bovio's son
 Libero Bovio - Giovanni Bovio's son - poet e musician
 Giovanni Bovio (... - 1970s) - Giovanni Bovio's grandson - lawyer
 Libero Corso Bovio (1948-2007) - Giovanni Bovio's great-grandson - lawyer, journalist and professor

See also 
 Francesco Maria Bovio
 Libero Bovio
 Libero Corso Bovio
 Altamuran Revolution

References

1837 births
1903 deaths
People from Trani
Kingdom of the Two Sicilies people
Politicians of Apulia
Italian Republican Party politicians
Deputies of Legislature XIII of the Kingdom of Italy
Deputies of Legislature XIV of the Kingdom of Italy
Deputies of Legislature XV of the Kingdom of Italy
Deputies of Legislature XVI of the Kingdom of Italy
Deputies of Legislature XVII of the Kingdom of Italy
Deputies of Legislature XVIII of the Kingdom of Italy
Deputies of Legislature XIX of the Kingdom of Italy
Deputies of Legislature XX of the Kingdom of Italy
Deputies of Legislature XXI of the Kingdom of Italy
Italian Freemasons
Italian philosophers